Calico Rock is a city in Izard County, Arkansas, United States. The population was 1,545 at the 2010 census, up from 991 in 2000.

History
Calico Rock was named from a colorful rock formation said by pioneers to resemble the textile calico.

Geography
Calico Rock is located in northwestern Izard County at  (36.122612, -92.133481), on the north bank of the White River. It is bordered to the north by the town of Pineville.

Major highways

 Arkansas Highway 5
 Arkansas Highway 56

Demographics

2020 census

As of the 2020 United States census, there were 888 people, 510 households, and 373 families residing in the city.

2000 census
As of the census of 2000, there were 991 people, 428 households, and 264 families residing in the city. The racial makeup of the city was 97.07% White, 0.20% Black or African American, 0.71% Native American, 0.20% Asian, 0.10% Pacific Islander, 0.40% from other races, and 1.31% from two or more races.  2.22% of the population were Hispanic or Latino of any race.

There were 428 households, out of which 27.8% had children under the age of 18 living with them, 45.8% were married couples living together, 12.6% had a female householder with no husband present, and 38.3% were non-families. 35.5% of all households were made up of individuals, and 17.1% had someone living alone who was 65 years of age or older.  The average household size was 2.20 and the average family size was 2.85.

In the city, the population was spread out, with 23.9% under the age of 18, 6.8% from 18 to 24, 24.6% from 25 to 44, 21.9% from 45 to 64, and 22.8% who were 65 years of age or older.  The median age was 40 years. For every 100 females, there were 90.6 males.  For every 100 females age 18 and over, there were 76.2 males.

The median income for a household in the city was $23,200, and the median income for a family was $31,328. Males had a median income of $20,833 versus $18,125 for females. The per capita income for the city was $14,305.  About 20.2% of families and 26.2% of the population were below the poverty line, including 41.9% of those under age 18 and 15.1% of those age 65 or over.

Education 
Public education for elementary and secondary students is primarily provided by the Calico Rock School District, which includes:

 Calico Rock Elementary School, serving kindergarten through grade 6.
 Calico Rock High School, serving grades 7 through 12.

Climate
The climate in this area is characterized by hot, humid summers and generally mild to cool winters.  According to the Köppen Climate Classification system, Calico Rock has a humid subtropical climate, abbreviated "Cfa" on climate maps.

References

External links
 City of Calico Rock official website 

Cities in Izard County, Arkansas
Cities in Arkansas